El Gornal, or simply Gornal, is a neighbourhood in L'Hospitalet de Llobregat, belonging to the metropolitan area of Barcelona. It's part of District VI of L'Hospitalet, along with Bellvitge. Its creation started with the urban expansion of Bellvitge into empty terrains around Renfe railtracks. From the 1970s on it has been growing extensively, with the introduction of apartment blocks destined for low-income people.

In 1991 the Civic Center was opened and commercial galleries (Mercat de Gornal) in 1994. Also commenced in 1994 was the third phase of housing, which was completed in 1997. This phase joined the district to the rest of the city and not remain so isolated, with a communal square created called Gornal. In 1999 the Hotel Entities opened (which was closed in 2010).

In January 2000, the commission affected by block designed by architect Ricardo Bofill estimated at 400 million pesetas, the amount in compensation for the damage to the houses. 2002 was the beginning of urban transformation of Granvía between Plaza Cerdà and Gornal. From 2006, major changes were carried out to improve the neighborhood and the rest of the city, including infrastructure works that have overlap between them: the collector of water that crosses the entire neighborhood in to centralized sewerage, remodeling Granvía, the excavation of the routes for the AVE (high speed train). On 20 October 2007 a sinkhole due to construction of the AVE paralyzed commuter lines and Catalan railways. It has been a very tough year that residents have suffered from dust, mud, fences everywhere and no place to park cars, so many chose to leave on sidewalks and gardens.

Today you can already see the transformation of the neighborhood. Vilanova Avenue with a large parking area, Av Granvía a landscaped promenade along its length and bike path, the Rambla remodeling Carmen Amaya and square in Europe. El Gornal has improved a lot and now has as many barriers had in his day. In its vicinity are the market town and several hotels. In January 2008 completed the repair of the tunnel. A third gateway that communicates with Gornal Vilanova del av Bellvitge America is built. It currently finishing the new tiling Rambla Carmen Amaya and some changes in the green areas.

Transport
Bellvitge - Rodalies de Catalunya line R2 (the railway line forms the border between Gornal and Bellvitge)
Can Tries - Gornal - Barcelona Metro lines 9 and 10
Gornal - Barcelona Metro line 8 and FGC Llobregat–Anoia Line
Buses LH1 and LH2 serve the district, while many buses run along Av. Gran Via (at the southern boundary of the district), including the 46, 65 and H12.

See also

References

L'Hospitalet de Llobregat